Iryna Volodymyrivna Chunykhovska   (born 16 July 1967) is a former sailor, who competed for the Soviet Union. She won a bronze medal in the 470 class at the 1988 Summer Olympics with Larisa Moskalenko.

References

1967 births
Soviet female sailors (sport)
Ukrainian female sailors (sport)
Olympic sailors of the Soviet Union
Sailors at the 1988 Summer Olympics – 470
Olympic bronze medalists for the Soviet Union
Olympic medalists in sailing
Living people
Medalists at the 1988 Summer Olympics